Stine Sofie's Foundation is a Norway-based children's rights charity formed to give support to  victims of child abuse or other forms of violence towards children. It also works towards assisting the abused child and their relatives, as well as campaigning and influencing the authorities to strengthen the rule of law and due process for children on a national level.

It is named after Stine Sofie Sørstrønen, one of the victims of the notorious Baneheia child murders in May 2000.

References

External links 
 Official website

Crisis hotlines
Organizations established in 2000
Foundations based in Norway